John Jacobson may refer to:
 John G. Jacobson, American politician and businessman
 John Christian Jacobson, Moravian bishop in the United States